Life Class is a novel by Pat Barker released in 2007. The novel is about students at the Slade School of Art in the first years of the twentieth century, one of whom volunteers to serve in a front line hospital during the First World War.

David Boyd Haycock's A Crisis of Brilliance: Five Young British Artists and the Great War (Old Street Publishing, 2009) presents the remarkable "true story" that lies behind Barker's novel.

References

Novels by Pat Barker
2007 British novels
Novels set during World War I
Hamish Hamilton books
Alumni of the Slade School of Fine Art